Linda Laura Brent (August 14, 1919 – May 7, 1994) was an American actress. She is best known for appear in westerns such as Below the Border (1942), Death Valley Rangers (1943) and The Laramie Trail (1944). Born in Shanghai, China to an Irish father and a Russian mother (née Vassilieva), Brent was voted as the "prettiest white girl in Shanghai" and later became an American citizen in 1942.

Filmography

Film

Television

References

External links 

Rotten Tomatoes profile

1919 births
1994 deaths
People from Shanghai
Actresses from Shanghai
American film actresses
20th-century American actresses